Lothar Geisler (8 December 1936 – 28 April 2019) was a German footballer.

Career

Statistics

1 1960–61 and 1962–63 include the German football championship playoffs.

References

External links
 

1936 births
Bundesliga players
German footballers
VfL Bochum players
Borussia Dortmund players
Borussia Dortmund II players
Association football defenders
Association football midfielders
2019 deaths
Footballers from Dortmund